Pavel Pelepyagin (born 29 June 1978) is a Belarusian middle-distance runner. He competed in the men's 800 metres at the 2000 Summer Olympics.

References

1978 births
Living people
Athletes (track and field) at the 2000 Summer Olympics
Belarusian male middle-distance runners
Olympic athletes of Belarus
Place of birth missing (living people)